May Charlesworth, known as Violet Charlesworth (born January 1884) was a British fraudster.

After obtaining money by misrepresenting herself as an heiress she faked her death in Wales on 2 January 1909. She was found and brought to trial.

She and her mother Miriam Charlesworth were sentenced to three years' penal servitude (reduced from an initial sentence of five years when the judge reconsidered his verdict); their appeal against the sentence was dismissed.

She was released from prison in February 1912 but nothing is known of her later life.

Her story attracted international attention.

References

1884 births
Year of death missing
British female criminals
British fraudsters
People who faked their own death